Joanne Yeoh Pei Sze is a Malaysian violinist and currently a lecturer in music at Universiti Putra Malaysia. Yeoh began playing piano at the age of four and violin at eight. Although classically trained, she also plays in contemporary settings; and is a much sought after violinist at corporate events. She has since released her solo instrumental debut album Pulse of the Metropolis in August 2005, her second album After A Dream in 2013, and her third album Life, Interrupted in 2021.

Awards
 The Outstanding Young Malaysian Award 2004: Personal Improvement and Accomplishment
 Martell’s Rising Personality Award 2008
 National Academic Award 2012: Arts and Creativity
 Malaysian Fujian Exemplary Performing Art Award 2017
 BrandLaureate Grand Master Brand ICON Leadership Award 2017
 McMillan Woods Global Icon Award 2019
 British Council Study UK Alumni Awards 2021: Professional Achievement Award Winner

References

External links
Joanne Yeoh Official Website

1977 births
Malaysian classical violinists
Alumni of Middlesex University
Alumni of the University of Leeds
Alumni of Heriot-Watt University
Living people
Malaysian people of Chinese descent
21st-century classical violinists